There Was a Young Man is a 1937 British comedy film directed by Albert Parker and starring Oliver Wakefield, Nancy O'Neil and Clifford Heatherley. It was made at Wembley Studios as a quota quickie by Twentieth Century Fox.

Cast
 Oliver Wakefield as George Peabody  
 Nancy O'Neil as Barbara Blake  
 Clifford Heatherley as Wallop 
 Robert Nainby as Vicar  
 Molly Hamley-Clifford as Mrs. Blake  
 Eric Hales as Vernon  
 Brian Buchel as Prince Bunkhadin  
 John Laurie as Stranger  
 Syd Crossley as Slim

References

Bibliography
 Chibnall, Steve. Quota Quickies: The Birth of the British 'B' Film. British Film Institute, 2007.
 Low, Rachael. Filmmaking in 1930s Britain. George Allen & Unwin, 1985.
 Wood, Linda. British Films, 1927-1939. British Film Institute, 1986.

External links

1937 films
British comedy films
1937 comedy films
Films directed by Albert Parker
Quota quickies
Films shot at Wembley Studios
20th Century Fox films
British black-and-white films
1930s English-language films
1930s British films